John Richardson Jr. (February 4, 1921 – December 26, 2014) was United States Assistant Secretary of State for Educational and Cultural Affairs from 1969 to 1977.

Biography
John Richardson Jr. was born and raised in Boston, Massachusetts and educated at Harvard University. His parents were John Richardson, an attorney and Republican political figure and Hope Hemenway Richardson, the daughter of Augustus and Harriet Hemenway.

During World War II, Richardson served in the United States Army as a paratrooper. After the war, he became a lawyer at the Wall Street law firm of Sullivan & Cromwell.  In 1955, he became an investment banker at Paine Webber.  He joined the International Rescue Committee later in 1955, staying there until 1961.  From 1961 to 1968, he was president of the National Committee for a Free Europe.

In 1969, President of the United States Richard Nixon nominated Richardson to be Assistant Secretary of State for Educational and Cultural Affairs and, after Senate confirmation, Richardson held that office from July 15, 1969, until March 7, 1977.

Upon leaving the United States Department of State in 1977, Richardon initially took a position with the Center for Strategic and International Studies, then served as president of Youth For Understanding from 1977 to 1986.  In 1986, he became president of the United States Institute of Peace, holding that position until his retirement in 1989.

Death

He died in Bethesda, Maryland at the age of 93.  His wife had died less than a month previously.

References

Other Resources

Interview from the Association for Diplomatic Studies and Training Foreign Affairs Oral History Project 

United States Assistant Secretaries of State
People from Boston
Harvard University alumni
United States Army personnel of World War II
1921 births
2014 deaths
Sullivan & Cromwell people
United States Army soldiers
Paratroopers